Liam Morrison (born 7 April 2003) is a Scottish professional footballer who plays as a defender for German club Bayern Munich II.

Club career

Early career
Morrison was born in Saltcoats, Scotland, and played for both Scottish giants Rangers and Celtic as a youth player.

Celtic

After some impressive performances with the latter, he was reportedly linked with a move to a number of English clubs, as well as German side 1899 Hoffenheim.

Morrison was promoted to the Celtic first team squad for pre-season friendlies in Austria and Switzerland in June 2019.

Bayern Munich
Around this time, German champions Bayern Munich made a bid to sign Morrison before Celtic were able to tie him down to a professional contract. Despite Celtic's efforts to persuade him to stay, Morrison joined Bayern in August 2019, and later revealed that his main reason for signing was the pathway to the German side's first team that was laid out to him. He was also quoted as saying that he initially believed the Bavarian side's interest was "a joke".

Morrison integrated well into Bayern Munich's youth teams, citing coaches Miroslav Klose and Martin Demichelis as great influences on improving his game. In October 2020, he was named among the 60 best young talents in the world by English newspaper The Guardian. After Barry Hepburn made the same move from Celtic to Bayern, Morrison was credited with helping his younger compatriot to integrate into the squad.

International career
Morrison has represented Scotland at under-16, under-17, under-19 and under-21 levels. He scored twice for the Scotland under-17 team in a 2–1 UEFA European Under-17 Championship qualification victory over Iceland in 2019.

Career statistics

References

2003 births
Living people
People from Saltcoats
Scottish footballers
Scotland youth international footballers
Association football defenders
Rangers F.C. players
Celtic F.C. players
FC Bayern Munich footballers
Scottish expatriate footballers
Scottish expatriate sportspeople in Germany
Expatriate footballers in Germany
Footballers from North Ayrshire
FC Bayern Munich II players
Regionalliga players
Scotland under-21 international footballers